Manuel E. Machado (born June 29, 1967) a Cuban-American businessman and the co-chairman of CCOMGROUP, a minority-owned communications agency headquartered in Miami, Florida.

Career 
Machado has worked for Univision Network, Burson-Marsteller, and Bacardi. In 1994, he worked as a communications entrepreneur, founded the Meka group, a marketing and communications firm that he initially ran out of his house, kicking off services with a project for Foot Locker surrounding Carnival Miami’s Calle Ocho Festival.

Machado co-founded MGSCOMM with his business partner Al Garcia-Serra in 2003, a Minority Business Enterprise with headquarters in Miami, Florida. The holding company for MGS, SWAY, PostMaster, and RunWild, ranked among the top 20 in the "2013 Advertising Age 50 Largest U.S. Hispanic Agencies", and among the top 100 in the "2012 Hispanic Business 500 Largest US Hispanic-Owned Companies".

Machado has been on the Audit and Compensation Committee of the Board of Directors of the Spanish Broadcasting System for 10 years.

Recognition
In 2013, Machado was named Agency Executive of the Year by HispanicAd.com.

References

1967 births
Living people
American chief executives